VPI Industries Inc., founded by Harry and Sheila Weisfeld, is an American manufacturer of high-end phonographs, tonearms, and phonograph accessories.

See also
 List of phonograph manufacturers

Footnotes

References

Periodicals

Websites

External links
VPI Industries homepage

American companies established in 1978
Manufacturing companies established in 1978
Phonograph manufacturers
Companies based in Monmouth County, New Jersey
Manufacturing companies based in New Jersey
Audio equipment manufacturers of the United States